Alphabaculovirus is a genus of viruses in the family Baculoviridae. The natural hosts of species in this family are invertebrates, among them winged insects (Lepidopterans, Hymenopterans, Dipterans), and decapods. However, species in this genus have been isolated only from Lepidoptera. There are 56 species in the genus.

Taxonomy
The following species are assigned to the genus:

 Adoxophyes honmai nucleopolyhedrovirus
 Agrotis ipsilon multiple nucleopolyhedrovirus
 Agrotis segetum nucleopolyhedrovirus A
 Agrotis segetum nucleopolyhedrovirus B
 Antheraea pernyi nucleopolyhedrovirus
 Anticarsia gemmatalis multiple nucleopolyhedrovirus
 Autographa californica multiple nucleopolyhedrovirus
 Bombyx mori nucleopolyhedrovirus
 Buzura suppressaria nucleopolyhedrovirus
 Catopsilia pomona nucleopolyhedrovirus
 Choristoneura fumiferana DEF multiple nucleopolyhedrovirus
 Choristoneura fumiferana multiple nucleopolyhedrovirus
 Choristoneura murinana nucleopolyhedrovirus
 Choristoneura rosaceana nucleopolyhedrovirus
 Chrysodeixis chalcites nucleopolyhedrovirus
 Chrysodeixis includens nucleopolyhedrovirus
 Clanis bilineata nucleopolyhedrovirus
 Condylorrhiza vestigialis nucleopolyhedrovirus
 Cryptophlebia peltastica nucleopolyhedrovirus
 Cyclophragma undans nucleopolyhedrovirus
 Ectropis obliqua nucleopolyhedrovirus
 Epiphyas postvittana nucleopolyhedrovirus
 Euproctis pseudoconspersa nucleopolyhedrovirus
 Helicoverpa armigera nucleopolyhedrovirus
 Hemileuca species nucleopolyhedrovirus
 Hyphantria cunea nucleopolyhedrovirus
 Hyposidra talaca nucleopolyhedrovirus
 Lambdina fiscellaria nucleopolyhedrovirus
 Leucania separata nucleopolyhedrovirus
 Lonomia obliqua nucleopolyhedrovirus
 Lymantria dispar multiple nucleopolyhedrovirus
 Lymantria xylina nucleopolyhedrovirus
 Mamestra brassicae multiple nucleopolyhedrovirus
 Mamestra configurata nucleopolyhedrovirus A
 Mamestra configurata nucleopolyhedrovirus B
 Maruca vitrata nucleopolyhedrovirus
 Mythimna unipuncta nucleopolyhedrovirus A
 Mythimna unipuncta nucleopolyhedrovirus B
 Operophtera brumata nucleopolyhedrovirus
 Orgyia leucostigma nucleopolyhedrovirus
 Orgyia pseudotsugata multiple nucleopolyhedrovirus
 Oxyplax ochracea nucleopolyhedrovirus
 Peridroma saucia nucleopolyhedrovirus
 Perigonia lusca nucleopolyhedrovirus
 Spodoptera eridania nucleopolyhedrovirus
 Spodoptera exempta nucleopolyhedrovirus
 Spodoptera exigua multiple nucleopolyhedrovirus A
 Spodoptera exigua multiple nucleopolyhedrovirus B
 Spodoptera frugiperda multiple nucleopolyhedrovirus
 Spodoptera littoralis nucleopolyhedrovirus
 Spodoptera litura nucleopolyhedrovirus
 Sucra jujuba nucleopolyhedrovirus
 Thysanoplusia orichalcea nucleopolyhedrovirus
 Trichoplusia ni single nucleopolyhedrovirus
 Urbanus proteus nucleopolyhedrovirus
 Wiseana signata nucleopolyhedrovirus

Structure
Viruses in Alphabaculovirus are enveloped, with circular genomes around 80–180 kbp in length. The genome codes for 100 to 180 proteins.

Life cycle
Alphabaculovirus replication is nuclear. Entry into the host cell is achieved by attachment of the viral glycoproteins to host receptors, which mediates endocytosis. Replication follows the double-stranded DNA bidirectional replication model. DNA-templated transcription with some alternative splicing mechanism is the method of transcription. Translation takes place by leaky scanning. The virus exits the host cell by nuclear pore export and exists in occlusion bodies after cell death, remaining infectious until finding another host. Winged insects, arthropods, Lepidoptera, Hymenoptera, Diptera, and Decapoda serve as natural hosts. Transmission routes are fecal-oral.

References

External links
 ICTV Report: Baculoviridae
 Viralzone: Alphabaculovirus

Baculoviridae
Virus genera